Starschema Inc. is a global data services consultancy based in Arlington, VA with additional offices in San Francisco, Budapest and Szeged.

History 
Founded in 2006 in Budapest, Hungary, Starschema initially worked for the European market. By the early 2010s, the company counted a number of Fortune 500 companies among its clients, including General Electric, Apple Inc. and Johnson & Johnson. In 2016, the Government of Hungary awarded Starschema the Grand Prix for Innovation in IT, and the company opened its US headquarters in the following year after a $5m investment by the Central European venture capital fund PortfoLion. Despite the COVID-19 pandemic, Starschema posted a revenue of $14.2m for the 2020 fiscal year.

Services 
Starschema's customer base has in recent years shifted towards a greater emphasis on the healthcare and life sciences portfolio. Alongside large multinational corporations, Starschema also serves a range of NGOs, such as the UN's World Food Programme. The company's global network of partners includes Amazon Web Services, Snowflake Inc. and Tableau Software. The company's main practice areas are

 data science, AI and machine learning,
 strategic consulting,
 data engineering, e.g. data warehousing and data lakes, and
 data visualization.

Awards and recognition 
The Financial Times ranked Starschema among the 1,000 fastest growing companies in Europe in 2019, and the company was listed as one of the fifty fastest-growing technology companies in Central Europe by Deloitte. In 2018, Aon Hewitt ranked Starschema as one of the best places to work in Hungary.

Starschema's work in public health has been widely recognized, including the company's cooperation with PATH on malaria surveillance in Ethiopia, Zambia and Senegal. During the COVID-19 pandemic, Starschema partnered with Snowflake Inc. to provide a comprehensive COVID-19 data set through Snowflake's Data Exchange.

References 

Software companies based in Virginia
Data companies
Technology companies of the United States
Companies based in Arlington County, Virginia